Maria Tsoni (Greek: Μαρία Τσώνη; born 1 March 1963 in Agrinio) is a retired Greek athlete who specialised in the sprinting events. She represented her country at the 1988 Summer Olympics, as well as the 1997 World Championships.

Competition record

Personal bests
Outdoor
100 metres – 11.30 (+0.4 m/s) (Bari 1997)
Indoor
60 metres – 7.23 (Piraeus 1998)

References

All-Athletics profile

1963 births
Living people
Sportspeople from Agrinio
Greek female sprinters
Olympic athletes of Greece
Athletes (track and field) at the 1988 Summer Olympics
World Athletics Championships athletes for Greece
Mediterranean Games silver medalists for Greece
Mediterranean Games medalists in athletics
Athletes (track and field) at the 1997 Mediterranean Games
Olympic female sprinters
20th-century Greek women